The tallest skyscrapers in Southwest Asia are ordered below from tallest to lowest.

Completed and under construction 

Tall
Southwest Asia